If I Were You may refer to:

Literature 
 If I Were You (Wodehouse novel), a 1931 novel by P.G. Wodehouse
 If I Were You (Hubbard novel), a 1940 novel by L. Ron Hubbard
 If I Were You (Si j'étais vous...), a 1947 novel by Julien Green

Music 
 "If I Were You", a 1930s song by Bob Emmerich with lyrics by Buddy Bernier, recorded by Billie Holiday, Fats Waller, Tommy Dorsey a.o.
 "If I Were You", a 1981 song by Lulu from Lulu
 "If I Were You", a 1985 song by Stevie Nicks from Rock a Little
 "If I Were You", a 1992 song by Celine Dion from Celine Dion
 "If I Were You", a 1993 song by Straitjacket Fits from Blow
 "If I Were You" (Collin Raye song), a 1994 song by Collin Raye
 "If I Were You" (Terri Clark song), a 1995 song by Terri Clark
 "If I Were You" (k.d. lang song), 1995
 "If I Were You" (Kasey Chambers song), a 2002 song by Kasey Chambers
 "If I Were You", a 2004 song by Candee Jay
 "If I Were You" (Hoobastank song), a 2006 song by Hoobastank
 "If I Were You", a 2014 song by 2NE1
 "If I Were You", a Metalcore band from Poughkeepsie, NY
 If I Were You (EP),  a 2020 EP by David James, containing a title track

Theatre and film 
 If I Were You (Shver tsu zayn a yid), a 1914 play by Sholem Aleichem
 If I Were You, a 1938 play by Benn Levy
 If I Were You (play), a 2006 play by Alan Ayckbourn
 If I Were You (2006 film), a Brazilian film
 If I Were You (2012 Canadian film), a comedy-drama film starring Marcia Gay Harden
 If I Were You (2012 Chinese film), a romantic comedy film

Other uses 
 If I Were You (podcast), a comedy advice podcast hosted by Jake and Amir